Sir John Basil Rowland Grindrod KBE (14 December 1919 – 4 January 2009) was an English-born Australian Anglican bishop. He was the Primate of Australia from 1982 to 1989.

Grindrod was born in Aughton, Lancashire, England. He was educated at Repton School; Queen's College, Oxford (MA Oxon); and Lincoln Theological College. He was ordained a deacon in 1949 and a priest in 1952. He served as a curate at St Michael's Hulme, Manchester and then in Bundaberg, Queensland. He held incumbencies at All Souls' Ancoats, Manchester; and, moving to Australia, in Emerald, Queensland and North Rockhampton, Queensland while Archdeacon of Rockhampton.; and Christ Church, South Yarra.

Grindrod was the Bishop of Riverina from 1966 to 1971 and then Bishop of Rockhampton from 1971 to 1981. He was afterwards the Archbishop of Brisbane until 1989, additionally serving as Primate of the Anglican Church of Australia from 1982 to 1989. He took Australian citizenship in 1982 and was awarded a knighthood (KBE) in the 1983 New Year's Day Honours for services to religion.

Most of Grindrod's retirement years were spent in Murwillumbah in northern New South Wales then, from 2006, in Helensvale on the Gold Coast. He died, aged 89, on 4 January 2009, after a long illness.

References

External links
Grindrod, Sir John Basil (1919–2009), Anglican Obituaries Website

1919 births
2009 deaths
People educated at Repton School
Alumni of The Queen's College, Oxford
Anglican bishops of Riverina
Anglican bishops of Rockhampton
Anglican archdeacons in Australia
20th-century Anglican bishops in Australia
20th-century Anglican archbishops
Anglican archbishops of Brisbane
Primates of the Anglican Church of Australia
Australian Knights Commander of the Order of the British Empire
People from Aughton, Lancashire
Alumni of Lincoln Theological College